Antonio Trombetta (died 1514) was a Roman Catholic prelate who served as Bishop of Urbino (1511–1514).

Biography
On 7 Nov 1511, Antonio Trombetta was appointed during the papacy of Pope Julius II as Bishop of Urbino.
He served as Bishop of Urbino until his death in 1514.

References

External links and additional sources
 (for Chronology of Bishops) 
 (for Chronology of Bishops) 

16th-century Italian Roman Catholic bishops
Bishops appointed by Pope Julius II
1514 deaths